Hillary Allen is an American professional ultrarunner and endurance athlete. She is sponsored by Brooks Running.

Career
Allen began trail running while she was studying for her PhD in science, but shortly after started competing—and winning—races. She quickly went on to become an accomplished high-altitude trail runner.

In 2017, Allen was ranked one of the top runners in the world when she suffered a near-fatal accident while competing in the Hamperroken Skyrace in Tromso, Norway. The athlete fell 150 feet off a ridge, breaking both arms, two vertebrae, several ribs, and bones in her feet. Allen, nicknamed "Hillygoat," endured a year of physical and mental recovery before returning to the sport to compete in the Broken Arrow Vertical Kilometer race in mid-2018. She has acknowledged that there were times when death seemed easier than recovering.

Two years after her accident, Allen returned to compete in the Hamperroken Skyrace and conquered the course that almost killed her. In 2019, she gave a TedX talk about her recovery titled "You Can Challenge the Impossible." One of Allen's goals is to inspire more women to get into trail running.

Book
She is the author of Out and Back: A Runner's Story of Survival Against All Odds.

References 

Ultramarathon runners
Trail runners

Year of birth missing (living people)
Living people